Veera Ballala is the name of multiple South Indian kings of the Hoysala Empire:
 Veera Ballala I 1102 - 1108 CE
 Veera Ballala II 1173-1220 CE
 Veera Ballala III 1291-1343 CE